The Aints is a band name used by Ed Kuepper during his prolific early 1990s period. The group's name relates to Kuepper's first recording group, The Saints, and its initial incarnation concentrated on material from the mid-to-late 1970s. The group then took on a life of its own and produced loud, feedback-drenched recordings of new Kuepper originals. In 2017, Kuepper convened a new iteration, this time adding an exclamation mark (thus officially known as The Aints!) to record and tour material he had written between the years 1969-1978, much of which had been in the setlist of the original Saints but which had, with few exceptions, not been recorded or released.

History

1991–1995 
The name is a variation on The Saints, the band Kuepper had formed with Chris Bailey in Brisbane in the early 1970s. It apparently derived from an old Saints bass drum head on which the initial letter "S" had worn off.

Kuepper has stated his aim with The Aints was to recapture the energy of the late 1970s incarnation of the Saints. Although the band's set started with Saints material, the sound of the band was more a driving three-piece with Neil Young-style feedback. The later original material featured saxophone and a more free-form approach.

The band started playing around Sydney on 13 April 1991 with Kuepper (guitar, vocals), Kent Steedman (bass) and Tim Reeves (drums). They quickly released a recording of this first show, S.L.S.Q – Very Live!, recorded on cassette, sold at shows as well as in shops. (The name stands for "Strictly Limited Sound Quality" or "Slightly Limited Sound Quality".) This recording and the Australian tour shows of 1991 consisted of old Saints material.

In this period, Kuepper was releasing new albums at a rate of roughly three a year. The Aints were quickly added to this release cycle. With Artie Sledge (bass), Mark Dawson (drums) and Tim Hopkins (sax), the Aints released two albums of original songs: Ascension in November 1991 and Autocannibalism in 1992, both on Hot Records.

Hot issued a five-track CD EP compilation, Cheap Erotica, in November 1993, and a compilation, Shelflife Unlimited!!! – Hotter Than Blazing Pistols!!!, in August 1995. A third Aints album called Afterlife was recorded but is yet to be issued.

2017–present: The Aints!
In 2017, Kuepper enlisted bassist Peter Oxley (Sunnyboys), drummer Paul Larsen Loughhead (The Celibate Rifles/The New Christs), jazz pianist Alister Spence, and trumpeter and brass arranger Eamon Dilworth. The band performed shows throughout Australia in 2017–2018, primarily focusing on material from The Saints' catalogue (1973–1978). The debut studio album from the group (now known as 'The Aints!') is The Church of Simultaneous Existence, and features songs written by Kuepper in and around his tenure in The Saints. The album was released on 21 September 2018, through ABC Music. It debuted at number 82 on the ARIA Albums Chart.

Discography

Albums

Awards and nominations

ARIA Music Awards
The ARIA Music Awards are a set of annual ceremonies presented by Australian Recording Industry Association (ARIA), which recognise excellence, innovation, and achievement across all genres of the music of Australia. They commenced in 1987.

! 
|-
| 1992
| Ascension
| ARIA Award for Best Independent Release
| 
|

References

New South Wales musical groups